Maryanoff is a surname. Notable people with the surname include:

Bruce E. Maryanoff (born 1947), American chemist
Cynthia A. Maryanoff (born 1949), American chemist